Suspensors are anatomical structures found in certain fungi and plants.

Fungi
In fungi, suspensors are filamentous structural formations having the function of holding a zygospore between two strains of hyphae.

Plants
In plants, suspensors are found in zygotes in angiosperms, connecting the endosperm to an embryo. Usually in dicots the suspensor cells divide transversally a few times to form a filamentous suspensor of 6-10 cells. The suspensor helps in pushing the embryo into the endosperm. The first cell of the suspensor towards the micropylar end becomes swollen and functions as a haustorium. The haustorium has wall ingrowths similar to those of a transfer cell. The last of the suspensors at the end of the embryo is known as hypophysis. Hypophysis later gives rise to the radicle and root cap. During embryo development in angiosperm seeds, normal development involves asymmetrical division of the unicellular embryo, inducing polarity. The smaller terminal cell divides to become the proembryo while the larger basal cell divides laterally to form the suspensor. The suspensor is analogous to a placental mammalian's umbilical cord.

References

Further reading

 C.J. Alexopolous, Charles W. Mims, M. Blackwell, Introductory Mycology, 4th ed. (John Wiley and Sons, Hoboken NJ, 2004)  
 Neil A. Campbell, Jane B. Reece, Biology, Seventh Edition (Bejamin Cummings, San Francisco, CA 94111) 

Fungal morphology and anatomy
Plant reproduction
Plant anatomy